The Dragan Dautovski Quartet is a Macedonian quartet founded in July 2000. It was formed by Dragan Dautovski and the vocalist is Aleksandra Popovska, with Ratko Dautovski on drums.

Discography
Roots and blossoms, 2000
Path of the sun, 2002
Razboj, 2008

External links
 Dragan Dautovski

Macedonian musical groups
Musical groups established in 2000
2000 establishments in the Republic of Macedonia